James Prescott Joule  (24 December 1818 11 October 1889) was an English physicist, mathematician and brewer, born in Salford, Lancashire. Joule studied the nature of heat, and discovered its relationship to mechanical work. This led to the law of conservation of energy, which in turn led to the development of the first law of thermodynamics. The SI derived unit of energy, the joule, is named after him.

He worked with Lord Kelvin to develop an absolute thermodynamic temperature scale, which came to be called the Kelvin scale. Joule also made observations of magnetostriction, and he found the relationship between the current through a resistor and the heat dissipated, which is also called Joule's first law. His experiments about energy transformations were first published in 1843.

Early years
James Joule was born in 1818, the son of Benjamin Joule (1784–1858), a wealthy brewer, and his wife, Alice Prescott, on New Bailey Street in Salford. Joule was tutored as a young man by the famous scientist John Dalton and was strongly influenced by chemist William Henry and Manchester engineers Peter Ewart and Eaton Hodgkinson. He was fascinated by electricity, and he and his brother experimented by giving electric shocks to each other and to the family's servants.

As an adult, Joule managed the brewery. Science was merely a serious hobby. Sometime around 1840, he started to investigate the feasibility of replacing the brewery's steam engines with the newly invented electric motor. His first scientific papers on the subject were contributed to William Sturgeon's Annals of Electricity. Joule was a member of the London Electrical Society, established by Sturgeon and others.

Motivated in part by a businessman's desire to quantify the economics of the choice, and in part by his scientific inquisitiveness, he set out to determine which prime mover was more efficient. He discovered Joule's first law in 1841, that the heat which is evolved by the proper action of any voltaic current is proportional to the square of the intensity of that current, multiplied by the resistance to conduction which it experiences. He went on to realize that burning a pound of coal in a steam engine was more economical than a costly pound of zinc consumed in an electric battery. Joule captured the output of the alternative methods in terms of a common standard, the ability to raise a mass weighing one pound to a height of one foot, the foot-pound.

However, Joule's interest diverted from the narrow financial question to that of how much work could be extracted from a given source, leading him to speculate about the convertibility of energy. In 1843 he published results of experiments showing that the heating effect he had quantified in 1841 was due to generation of heat in the conductor and not its transfer from another part of the equipment. This was a direct challenge to the caloric theory which held that heat could neither be created or destroyed. Caloric theory had dominated thinking in the science of heat since introduced by Antoine Lavoisier in 1783. Lavoisier's prestige and the practical success of Sadi Carnot's caloric theory of the heat engine since 1824 ensured that the young Joule, working outside either academia or the engineering profession, had a difficult road ahead. Supporters of the caloric theory readily pointed to the symmetry of the Peltier–Seebeck effect to claim that heat and current were convertible in an, at least approximately, reversible process.

The mechanical equivalent of heat
Further experiments and measurements with his electric motor led Joule to estimate the mechanical equivalent of heat as 4.1868 joules per calorie of work to raise the temperature of one gram of water by one Kelvin. He announced his results at a meeting of the chemical section of the British Association for the Advancement of Science in Cork in August 1843 and was met by silence.

Joule was undaunted and started to seek a purely mechanical demonstration of the conversion of work into heat. By forcing water through a perforated cylinder, he could measure the slight viscous heating of the fluid. The fact that the values obtained both by electrical and purely mechanical means were in agreement to at least one order of magnitude was, to Joule, compelling evidence of the reality of the convertibility of work into heat.

Joule now tried a third route. He measured the heat generated against the work done in compressing a gas. In many ways, this experiment offered the easiest target for Joule's critics but Joule disposed of the anticipated objections by clever experimentation. Joule read his paper to the Royal Society on 20 June 1844, but his paper was rejected for publication by the Royal Society and he had to be content with publishing in the Philosophical Magazine in 1845. In the paper he was forthright in his rejection of the caloric reasoning of Carnot and Émile Clapeyron, a rejection partly theologically driven:

Joule here adopts the language of vis viva (energy), possibly because Hodgkinson had read a review of Ewart's On the measure of moving force to the Literary and Philosophical Society in April 1844.

Joule wrote in his 1844 paper:

In June 1845, Joule read his paper On the Mechanical Equivalent of Heat to the British Association meeting in Cambridge. In this work, he reported his best-known experiment, involving the use of a falling weight, in which gravity does the mechanical work, to spin a paddle wheel in an insulated barrel of water which increased the temperature. He wrote a letter to the Philosophical Magazine, published in September 1845 describing his experiment.

Reception and priority

Much of the initial resistance to Joule's work stemmed from its dependence upon extremely precise measurements. He claimed to be able to measure temperatures to within  of a degree Fahrenheit (3 mK). Such precision was certainly uncommon in contemporary experimental physics but his doubters may have neglected his experience in the art of brewing and his access to its practical technologies. He was also ably supported by scientific instrument-maker John Benjamin Dancer. Joule's experiments complemented the theoretical work of Rudolf Clausius, who is considered by some to be the coinventor of the energy concept.

Joule was proposing a kinetic theory of heat (he believed it to be a form of rotational, rather than translational, kinetic energy), and this required a conceptual leap: if heat was a form of molecular motion, why didn't the motion of the molecules gradually die out? Joule's ideas required one to believe that the collisions of molecules were perfectly elastic. Importantly, the very existence of atoms and molecules was not widely accepted for another 50 years.

Although it may be hard today to understand the allure of the caloric theory, at the time it seemed to have some clear advantages. Carnot's successful theory of heat engines had also been based on the caloric assumption, and only later was it proved by Lord Kelvin that Carnot's mathematics were equally valid without assuming a caloric fluid.

However, in Germany, Hermann Helmholtz became aware both of Joule's work and the similar 1842 work of Julius Robert von Mayer. Though both men had been neglected since their respective publications, Helmholtz's definitive 1847 declaration of the conservation of energy credited them both.

Also in 1847, another of Joule's presentations at the British Association in Oxford was attended by George Gabriel Stokes, Michael Faraday, and the precocious and maverick William Thomson, later to become Lord Kelvin, who had just been appointed professor of natural philosophy at the University of Glasgow. Stokes was "inclined to be a Joulite" and Faraday was "much struck with it" though he harboured doubts. Thomson was intrigued but sceptical.

Unanticipated, Thomson and Joule met later that year in Chamonix. Joule married Amelia Grimes on 18 August and the couple went on honeymoon. Marital enthusiasm notwithstanding, Joule and Thomson arranged to attempt an experiment a few days later to measure the temperature difference between the top and bottom of the Cascade de Sallanches waterfall, though this subsequently proved impractical.

Though Thomson felt that Joule's results demanded theoretical explanation, he retreated into a spirited defence of the Carnot-Clapeyron school. In his 1848 account of absolute temperature, Thomson wrote that "the conversion of heat (or caloric) into mechanical effect is probably impossible, certainly undiscovered" – but a footnote signalled his first doubts about the caloric theory, referring to Joule's "very remarkable discoveries". Surprisingly, Thomson did not send Joule a copy of his paper but when Joule eventually read it he wrote to Thomson on 6 October, claiming that his studies had demonstrated conversion of heat into work but that he was planning further experiments. Thomson replied on the 27th, revealing that he was planning his own experiments and hoping for a reconciliation of their two views. Though Thomson conducted no new experiments, over the next two years he became increasingly dissatisfied with Carnot's theory and convinced of Joule's. In his 1851 paper, Thomson was willing to go no further than a compromise and declared "the whole theory of the motive power of heat is founded on two propositions, due respectively to Joule, and to Carnot and Clausius".

As soon as Joule read the paper he wrote to Thomson with his comments and questions. Thus began a fruitful, though largely epistolary, collaboration between the two men, Joule conducting experiments, Thomson analysing the results and suggesting further experiments. The collaboration lasted from 1852 to 1856, its discoveries including the Joule–Thomson effect, and the published results did much to bring about general acceptance of Joule's work and the kinetic theory.

Kinetic theory

Kinetics is the science of motion. Joule was a pupil of Dalton and it is no surprise that he had learned a firm belief in the atomic theory, even though there were many scientists of his time who were still skeptical. He had also been one of the few people receptive to the neglected work of John Herapath on the kinetic theory of gases. He was further profoundly influenced by Peter Ewart's 1813 paper On the measure of moving force.

Joule perceived the relationship between his discoveries and the kinetic theory of heat. His laboratory notebooks reveal that he believed heat to be a form of rotational, rather than translational motion.

Joule could not resist finding antecedents of his views in Francis Bacon, Sir Isaac Newton, John Locke, Benjamin Thompson (Count Rumford) and Sir Humphry Davy. Though such views are justified, Joule went on to estimate a value for the mechanical equivalent of heat of 1,034 foot-pound from Rumford's publications. Some modern writers have criticised this approach on the grounds that Rumford's experiments in no way represented systematic quantitative measurements. In one of his personal notes, Joule contends that Mayer's measurement was no more accurate than Rumford's, perhaps in the hope that Mayer had not anticipated his own work.

Joule has been attributed with explaining the sunset green flash phenomenon in a letter to the Manchester Literary and Philosophical Society in 1869; actually, he merely noted (with a sketch) the last glimpse as bluish green, without attempting to explain the cause of the phenomenon.

Published work

Honours

Joule died at home in Sale and is buried in Brooklands cemetery there. There is also a quotation from the Gospel of John: "I must work the work of him that sent me, while it is day: the night cometh, when no man can work". The Wetherspoon's pub in Sale, the town of his death, is named "The J. P. Joule" after him.

Joule's many honours and commendations include:

Fellow of the Royal Society (1850)
Royal Medal (1852), 'For his paper on the mechanical equivalent of heat, printed in the Philosophical Transactions for 1850'
Copley Medal (1870), 'For his experimental researches on the dynamical theory of heat'
President of Manchester Literary and Philosophical Society (1860)
President of the British Association for the Advancement of Science (1872, 1887)
Honorary Membership of the Institution of Engineers and Shipbuilders in Scotland (1857)
Honorary degrees:
LL.D., Trinity College, Dublin (1857)
DCL, University of Oxford (1860)
LL.D., University of Edinburgh (1871)
Joule received a civil list pension of £200 per annum in 1878 for services to science
Albert Medal of the Royal Society of Arts (1880), 'for having established, after most laborious research, the true relation between heat, electricity and mechanical work, thus affording to the engineer a sure guide in the application of science to industrial pursuits'

There is a memorial to Joule in the north choir aisle of Westminster Abbey, though he is not buried there, contrary to what some biographies state. A statue of Joule by Alfred Gilbert stands in Manchester Town Hall, opposite that of Dalton.

Family

In 1847, Joule married Amelia Grimes. Joule became a widower when she died in 1854, 7 years after their wedding. They had three children together: a son, Benjamin Arthur Joule (1850–1922), a daughter, Alice Amelia (1852–1899) and a second son, Joe (born 1854, who died three weeks later) Alice had grown to be a beautiful girl like her mother. Benjamin became strong like his father.  Joule was proud of Alice and Benjamin. When James had died in 1889-Alice and Benjamin were devastated. 10 years later Alice had died Benjamin had been alone until he found a perfect wife which he married and died 1922.

See also
Latent heat
Sensible heat
Internal energy

References

Footnotes

Citations

Sources

Further reading

Fox, R, "James Prescott Joule, 1818–1889", in

External links

The scientific papers of James Prescott Joule (1884) – annotated by Joule
The joint scientific papers of James Prescott Joule (1887) – annotated by Joule
Classic papers of 1845 and 1847 at ChemTeam website On the Mechanical Equivalent of Heat and On the Existence of an Equivalent Relation between Heat and the ordinary Forms of Mechanical Power
Joule's water friction apparatus at London Science Museum
Some Remarks on Heat and the Constitution of Elastic Fluids, Joule's 1851 estimate of the speed of a gas molecule
Joule Manuscripts at John Rylands Library, Manchester.
University of Manchester material on Joule – includes photographs of Joule's house and gravesite
Joule Physics Laboratory at the University of Salford

 
1818 births
1889 deaths
19th-century British physicists
English physicists
Fellows of the American Academy of Arts and Sciences
Fellows of the Royal Society
Foreign associates of the National Academy of Sciences
Fluid dynamicists
History of Greater Manchester
People associated with electricity
People associated with energy
People from Salford
Recipients of the Copley Medal
Royal Medal winners
Thermodynamicists
Manchester Literary and Philosophical Society